Campus Point State Marine Conservation Area (SMCA) is a marine protected area that protects the waters along and off the coast of the University of California, Santa Barbara, the student community of Isla Vista, and the University's Coal Oil Point Reserve. The SMCA covers 10.51 square miles, including Goleta Point (also known as "Campus Point").   The marine protected areas protect natural habitats and marine life by prohibiting or limiting removal of wildlife from within their boundaries.

Establishment
Campus Point SMCA is one of 36 marine protected areas adopted by the California Fish and Game Commission in December, 2010 during the third phase of the Marine Life Protection Act Initiative.  The MLPAI is a collaborative public process to create a statewide network of protected areas along California's coastline.  The south coast's new marine protected areas were designed by local divers, fishermen, conservationists and scientists who comprised the South Coast Regional Stakeholder Group.  Their job was to design a network of protected areas that would preserve sensitive sea life and habitats while enhancing recreation, study and education opportunities.  The south coast marine protected areas went into effect in 2012.

Habitat and wildlife
Campus Point SMCA  is designed to protect habitat and species diversity. This SMCA represents and protects a wide diversity of habitat types including eelgrass, surfgrass, kelp, rocky reefs, shallow subtidal, rocky intertidal, oil seeps, sand, and the estuarine inputs of Devereux Slough. It's also known as one of the best places for the Western snowy plover.

Recreation and nearby attractions

Campus Point SMCA prohibits the take of all living marine resources.  However, California's marine protected areas encourage recreational and educational uses of the ocean.  Activities such as kayaking, diving, snorkeling, and swimming are allowed.

University of California, Santa Barbara is a coastal attraction of its own, featuring miles of sandy beaches, a semi-enclosed lagoon and the school's world-class Marine Science Institute.  Access to the coast along this fully marine protected area is available from Goleta Beach County Park, various coastal access points on University property, staircases and trails in the community of Isla Vista, and from the Ellwood Beach area of Goleta. The dunes and blufftop here are part of an elaborate restoration effort, including a docent program to protect and interpret the nesting area of rare snowy plover shorebirds.

Scientific monitoring
As specified by the Marine Life Protection Act, select marine protected areas along California's south coast are being monitored by scientists to track their effectiveness and learn more about ocean health. Similar studies in marine protected areas located off of the Santa Barbara Channel Islands have already detected gradual improvements in fish size and number.

References

External links 
Marine Life Protection Act Initiative

Protected areas of Santa Barbara County, California
University of California, Santa Barbara
Protected areas established in 2010
2010 establishments in California